Blarney GAA is a Gaelic Athletic Association club based in the town of Blarney, County Cork, Ireland. The club fields Gaelic football, hurling and camogie teams in competitions organized by Cork GAA county board and the Muskerry divisional board. In 2008, the club won the Premier division of the Cork Intermediate Hurling Championship, and played in the Cork Senior Hurling Championship in 2009.

History 

Blarney GAA was formed in 1884 and is one of the oldest GAA clubs in Ireland.

Achievements 
 Cork Senior Hurling Championship Runners-Up 1894
 Cork Premier Intermediate Hurling Championship Winners (2) 2008, 2020
 Munster Intermediate Club Hurling Championship Winners (1) 2008
 All-Ireland Intermediate Club Hurling Championship Winners (1) 2009
 Cork Intermediate Hurling Championship Winners (2) 1937, 1938 Runners-Up 1999
 Cork Junior Hurling Championship Winners (2) 1936, 1993  Runners-Up 1898
 Cork Minor Hurling Championship Winners (1) 2018 Runners-Up 1945
 Cork Premier 2 Minor Hurling Championship Winners (1) 2016
 Cork Minor A Hurling Championship Winners (2) 1997, 2004
 Cork Under-21 Hurling Championship Runners-Up 1986
 Mid Cork Junior A Hurling Championship Winners (13) titles 1931, 1934, 1936, 1943, 1944, 1946, 1969, 1978, 1979, 1980, 1985, 1992, 1993 Runners-Up 1939, 1947, 1948, 1951, 1955, 1968, 1971, 1972, 1976, 1984, 1988, 1989, 1990, 2002, 2005
 Mid Cork Junior A Football Championship Winners (4) titles 1951, 1954, 2009, 2010  Runners-Up 1986, 1990, 1994

Notable players
 Shane Barrett
 Pádraig Power
 Mark Coleman: 2017 All-Star
 John Griffin: Kerry hurler Christy Ring Cup winning captain
 Joe Jordan: Cork Senior Hurler
 Conor te Forde: Bench pressed 90kg 3x7

References

External sources
 Blarney GAA Website
 Cork GAA Results

Gaelic games clubs in County Cork
Gaelic football clubs in County Cork
Hurling clubs in County Cork
1884 establishments in Ireland